"Breakthru" is a song by the British rock band Queen. Written by Freddie Mercury and Roger Taylor but credited to Queen, it was released in June 1989 from the album The Miracle. The single reached number seven in the UK, and peaked at number 6 in the Netherlands and Ireland, but failed to chart in the US. The song is notable for its video where the group is performing the song on an open platform of a fast-moving steam train.

Song
The album version of the song begins with 30 seconds of slow vocal harmony. It was apparently written by Freddie Mercury for a different song which ended up never being released, "A New Life Is Born". It then abruptly changes to a fast-paced rocker, that was written by Roger Taylor. Other song versions were created by either extending or cutting the introduction. On the Queen for an Hour interview conducted in 1989, Mercury said that this was a great example of two separate bits coming together to make a final track. He commented on how the band had about 30 tracks to work with and only completed a handful, working on all of them at least somewhat.

Video

The video of the song was filmed within two days on the preserved Nene Valley Railway, near Peterborough in Cambridgeshire, England. The group members mentioned in the interviews that despite the hot summer weather, the event brought a nice refreshment to their studio work. It also helped heighten guitarist Brian May's spirits, as he was going through a bout of depression from the intense scrutiny surrounding his first marriage and Freddie Mercury's health starting to falter as a result of AIDS.

The steam locomotive No. 3822 (fired by Mark Needham) and an open platform were rented by Queen from the Didcot Railway Centre in Oxfordshire and repainted for the video. In particular, the group named the train "The Miracle Express", and this name was reflected in large red letters on the sides of the locomotive.

The idea of using a train in the video was suggested by Taylor and was inspired by the rhythm of the rapid part of the song. During the introduction ("new life is born"), the video features Taylor's then-girlfriend Debbie Leng, with a black mask painted around her eyes, waking up and getting up on the rail track. The commencing of the fast part coincides with the scene of the train breaking through a polystyrene wall painted as a brick wall; the wall was constructed in a tunnel, under an arch of a stone bridge. The group was dissatisfied with this part because polystyrene could not stand the enormous air pressure buildup in the tunnel from the incoming train and the wall started breaking before the physical impact. The rest of the clip mostly shows the moving train with an attached open platform whereon the group performs the song.

May, Deacon and Taylor are playing guitars and drums, whereas Mercury is moving around the whole platform with his trademark bottomless microphone stand while singing. Leng appears in some scenes on the platform and further in the clip. The train was reportedly going at a speed of between 30 and 60 mph (intermediate values were mentioned in interviews), and thus the group insured itself for £2 million against bodily damage. The clip cost £300,000 (£719,189.40 in today's money) to make.

Queen comments on the record

Track listings 
7" Single

A Side. "Breakthru" (Album Version) - 4:08

B Side. "Stealin" - 3:58

12"/CD Single

1/A Side. "Breakthru" (Extended Version) - 5:45

2/B1. "Stealin" - 3:58

3/B2. "Breakthru" (Album Version) - 4:08

Personnel
Queen

Freddie Mercury - lead and backing vocals, piano, keyboard
Brian May - electric guitar, backing vocals
Roger Taylor - drums, keyboard, backing vocals
John Deacon - bass guitar
Additional
David Richards - keyboards, synth bass, programming

Distribution
The single was distributed in 1989 as 7-inch and 12-inch records, 5-inch CDs and tapes, with a Parlophone label in most countries. The label was from Capitol in the US. The B-side either contained the song "Stealin'", was only used as an addition to "Breakthru", or was blank as in some UK 12" records. Other 12" records and 5" CDs contained two versions of "Breakthru" and one of "Stealin'". Most covers contained a photomorph of four heads of the group members; the faces were merged at one eye of each face creating a five-eyed merged face. A strip showing eyes only was cut of this picture for most covers.

The song was included into the following albums and compilations: The Miracle, Greatest Hits II, The Platinum Collection, Box of Tricks, Greatest Video Hits 2 (disk 1), Greatest Flix II (VHS)  and Queen: The eYe (electronic video game released in 1998 by Electronic Arts).

Charts

References

External links
 
 Lyrics at Queen official website

1989 songs
1989 singles
Queen (band) songs
Parlophone singles
Songs written by Roger Taylor (Queen drummer)
Songs written by Freddie Mercury
EMI Records singles
Capitol Records singles
Hollywood Records singles